Spergula morisonii, commonly known as Morison's spurry, is a species of flowering plant belonging to the family Caryophyllaceae. It is native range is Europe and northwestern Africa.

References

Caryophyllaceae